Semyonov (masculine), also transliterated as Semenov, Semenoff, and Semionov, or Semyonova (Semenova, Semionova; feminine) is a common Russian last name. It is derived from the Russian male name Semyon (related to Simeon, Simon) and literally means Semyon's. It is transliterated in Estonian and Latvian as Semjonov.

Places
Semyonov, Russia, several places in Russia

People

Semyonov/a
Alexander Semyonov (disambiguation), several people
Alexey Semyonov (disambiguation), several people
Alexey Semyonov (politics), member of the American Committee for Peace in Chechnya
Andrey Semyonov (disambiguation), several people
Arkadiy Semyonov (born 1959), Russian poet
Fyodor Semyonov, Russian astronomer and hero of the Soviet Union
Grigory Ivanovich Semyonov, former Socialist Revolutionary who became a Bolshevik chekist
Grigory Mikhaylovich Semyonov, Commander of the White Army, an ataman
Ivan Semyonov (disambiguation), several people
Konstantin Semyonov (born 1969), former Soviet Israeli pole vaulter
Ksenia Semyonova, Russian artistic gymnast
Marina Semyonova, Russian prima ballerina
Mikhail Semyonov (disambiguation), several people
Nikolay Semyonov, Russian/Soviet physicist and chemist
Semyon Semyonov, Russian KGB case officer
Svetlana Semyonova, Russian rower
Vladimir Semyonov (general) (born 1940), first president of the Karachay-Cherkess Republic, Russia
Vladimir Semyonov (diplomat), Soviet diplomat and party figure
Yulian Semyonov, Russian writer of spy fiction
Yuno Semyonov (1899–1961), Soviet prose writer, playwright and artistic director
Andrey Semyonov-Tyan-Shansky, Russian/Soviet entomologist and explorer
Pyotr Semyonov-Tyan-Shansky, Russian geographer and explorer

Semenov/a
Aleksandra Semenova (born 1998), Russian rhythmic gymnast
Ekaterina Semenova, Russian actress
Oleksiy Semenov (born 1982), Ukrainian discus thrower
Tatiana Semenova, Russian-American ballet dancer
Zinaida Semenova (born 1962), Russian long-distance runner
Andrey Aldan-Semenov, Russian writer and political prisoner

Semjonov/a
Uljana Semjonova, Soviet Latvian basketball player

Semionov/a
Alexander Semionov, Russian painter
Polina Semionova, Russian ballet dancer

Patronymic surnames
Surnames from given names